Derek Lee Nixon is an American actor and producer. He grew up in Texas and gained notoriety in 2002 after starring in Mary-Kate and Ashley's, When in Rome and in several Hollywood films, including Hallettsville (with Gary Busey), The Lights (with Joe Estevez), Outrage (with Michael Madsen, Natasha Lyonne, and Michael Berryman), The Jerk Theory (with Tom Arnold, Jenna Dewan-Tatum, Josh Henderson, Lauren Storm), and then starring in Texas Chainsaw Massacre franchise co-creator Kim Henkel's Boneboys. His Television Credits include guest starring on Boston Public and the short lived series Do Over with a recurring job on The Andy Dick Show.

Early life
Derek Lee Nixon was born in San Antonio, Texas, he graduated from Churchill High School in 2001. Nixon began his acting career at the age of 6, landing his first job a PSA (Public Service Announcement for the Department of Public Safety. From ages 6 to 14, Nixon worked on many regional commercials including Six Flags Fiesta Texas, Hispanic Chamber of Commerce, and Southwestern Bell. National commercials including Ford Motor Company, SeaWorld and DARE. Television credits included Spanish Club House with actresses Hilary Duff and Haylie Duff, Kaleidoscope, Boundaries and America's Most Wanted. This led to his move to Los Angeles, California at the age of 18.

School
He attended and graduated from Winston Churchill High School in San Antonio, Texas, 2001 via ACE. (Heresay)

Present life
He currently lives in Los Angeles, California, but spends a lot of his time back in San Antonio, with his daughter Tyler Jade Nixon and family.  Nixon is roommates with his director of Hallettsville Andrew Pozza and fellow actor Jordan Brower. Nixon is also close friends with another San Antonio native who starred in New York Minute, Jared Padalecki. (Irrelevant)

Career
Nixon's first credit was a minor role in the 1999 airing of the America's Most Wanted episode titled "The Jason Crawford Killing". In 2002, he was cast as Ryan in Mary-Kate and Ashley's When in Rome. Nixon and two others in 2004 developed a horror film Hallettsville in which Nixon played the title character with actor Gary Busey; the shooting dates were pushed forward because of financing issues. In 2006 Hallettsville was under way with a direct to DVD release January 2009. In January 2007 Nixon produced and starred in a sci-fi thriller, The Lights, directed by John M. Sjogren, where he again played the lead character, with Ozzy Lusth from Survivor and Joe Estevez. In April 2007, Nixon teamed up with director Ace Cruz and co-produced and starred in Outrage, a thriller with actors Michael Madsen, Natasha Lyonne and Michael Berryman. In November 2007, Nixon signed onto the teen comedy The Jerk Theory; he stars alongside Josh Henderson, Jenna Dewan, and Tom Arnold.  Nixon produced and starred in the multi award-winning film A Schizophrenic Love Story alongside Academy Award nominee Bruce Davison in 2010. Nixon made his directorial debut in 2011 with the horror/comedy spoof Supernatural Activity with a release date in October 2012 and also starring in Butcher Boys, working with horror writer Kim Henkel the same year. Nixon produced Ya'Ke Smith's first feature film WOLF which premiered in 2012 at the SXSW Film Festival and won several other festivals including Dallas International Film Festival and Little Rock Film Festival's best picture awards. He also produced with Dave Sheridan The Walking Dead parody The Walking Deceased, in which he had a cameo and was one of the stars, who meet for the film premiere on WalkerStalkerCon.

Filmography

References

External links

Living people
American male film actors
American male television actors
Male actors from San Antonio
Year of birth missing (living people)